Tianmen is a sub-prefecture-level city (sometimes considered a county-level city) in central Hubei Province, China.

It is on the Jianghan Plain, on the west side of Wuhan (the biggest city of Central China, as well as the capital of Hubei) and the east of Jingzhou (a famous city in Chinese history). Formerly known as Jingling, it was renamed to Tianmen in 1726 during the Qing dynasty. The name comes from the Sky Gate Mountains (meaning “tianmen” in Chinese) which lie northwest of the city.

It is the hometown of Lu Yu, the writer of The Classic of Tea, who is respected as "the Sage of Tea" for his contribution to the tea culture. Tianmen has the largest population among the same-level cities in Central China. It was honoured "National Civilized City" by Chinese government in 2014.

Ancient history

Prehistoric ancient settlements in the Tianmen area existed at least 7,000 to 8,000 years ago as evidenced by Shijiahe neolithic tribal ruins which include recent discoveries of stone (jade) devices, pottery, bone, mussels, as well as bronze articles and other artifacts, such as those in the original Tao Zu patrilineal cultural heritage period.

Geography

Administrative divisions
Tianmen administers:

Climate

Transportation
 Tianmen South Railway Station and Xiantao West Railway Station on the Wuhan–Yichang Railway.

References 

Cities in Hubei
Wuhan urban agglomeration
Jianghan Plain
County-level divisions of Hubei